Joseph Blaine Johnson (August 29, 1893 – October 25, 1986) was an American politician who served as the 70th governor of Vermont from 1955 to 1959.

Biography
Born in Helsingborg, Sweden, Johnson moved with his family from Sweden to Springfield, Windsor County, Vermont, in 1902 and became a naturalized U.S. citizen. He graduated from the University of Vermont in 1915, became a mechanical engineer. Johnson was a Congregationalist. He married Virginia F. Slack on September 23, 1919.

Career
Johnson worked at the Bryant Chucking Grinder Company, starting as a draftsman and retiring as General Manager in 1949. He also served as vice president of the Springfield Cooperative Savings and Loan Association, director of the First National Bank of Springfield, and director of the Lovejoy Tool Company of Springfield.

Johnson was elected to the Vermont House of Representatives in 1945 and served from 1945 to 1946. He was elected to the Vermont Senate from Windsor County in 1947 and served until 1951. He then served two terms from 1951 to 1955 as the 65th lieutenant governor of Vermont.

Receiving the Republican nomination for governor, Johnson won the election and served from January 6, 1955 to January 6, 1959.  During his administration, he sponsored legislation supporting increased financial support for the University of Vermont. He also facilitated Vermont's inclusion in the federal interstate highway system. He was a Vermont delegate to the 1956 Republican National Convention. After serving two terms as governor, he retired from public life but remained director of the Lovejoy Tool Company.

Death
Johnson died on October 25, 1986, and is interred at Summerhill Cemetery, Springfield, Windsor County, Vermont.

See also
List of members of the American Legion
List of U.S. state governors born outside the United States

References

External links

National Governors Association
The Political Graveyard

Republican Party governors of Vermont
Republican Party Vermont state senators
Republican Party members of the Vermont House of Representatives
20th-century American engineers
American Congregationalists
1893 births
1986 deaths
People from Helsingborg
Swedish emigrants to the United States
20th-century American politicians